Kahani Rubberband Ki is an Indian Hindi-language drama film written, directed and produced by Sarika Sanjot. It stars Pratik Gandhi, Avika Gor, Manish Raisinghan and Gaurav Gera .

Plot
Kahani Rubberband Ki tells the story of a young, beautiful couple from different communities who live together in the state of Uttar Pradesh. After an unplanned pregnancy caused by a protection malfunction, all of their dreams are shattered. In order to protect his relationship with Kavya and raise public awareness, he accepts responsibility and files a complaint against the Condom manufacturer.

Cast
 Pratik Gandhi as Narendra Tripathi aka Nanno
 Avika Gor
 Manish Raisinghan
 Gaurav Gera
 Rajesh Jais
 Hemang Dave
 Aruna Irani
 Kanwarjit Paintal
 Amit Singh Thakur 
 Meenakshi Sethi
 Romil Chaudhary 
 Shyam Lal

Soundtrack

The music of the film is composed by Meet Bros, Anup Bhat while the lyrics written by Thaakur.

References

External links 
 
 

2022 drama films
2022 films
Indian drama films